The 1968 Pittsburgh Panthers football team represented the University of Pittsburgh in the 1968 NCAA University Division football season.  The team compiled a 1–9 record under head coach Dave Hart. The team's statistical leaders included Dave Havern with 1,810 passing yards and Denny Ferris with 472 rushing yards.

Schedule

Roster

References

Pittsburgh
Pittsburgh Panthers football seasons
Pittsburgh Panthers football